The 2019 Football Championship of Sumy Oblast was won by LS Group Verkhnia Syrovatka.

Just after the winter break on 4 March 2020 LS Group Verkhnia Syrovatka switched their name to FC Sumy and expressed their intention to play at national amateur competitions.

League table

References

External links

Football
Sumy
Sumy